Croía is a feminine name of Irish origin meaning little heart. It was the 38th most popular name for newborn Irish girls in 2022. The name rose in popularity after it was used by Conor McGregor for his daughter born in 2019.

Notes

Irish-language feminine given names